Omar Devani (born 1940) is an Argentine retired footballer. He scored a total of 195 goals in the Colombian Primera A.

Honours
Atlético Bucaramanga
Categoría Primera A top goalscorer (1): 1963

References

External links
 

1940 births
Living people
Argentine footballers
Argentine Primera División players
Categoría Primera A players
Club Atlético Vélez Sarsfield footballers
Deportivo Morón footballers
Atlético Bucaramanga footballers
Independiente Medellín footballers
Independiente Santa Fe footballers
Once Caldas footballers
Unión Magdalena footballers
Argentine emigrants to Colombia
Expatriate footballers in Colombia
Argentine expatriate sportspeople in Colombia
Association football forwards
Argentine expatriate footballers
Footballers from Córdoba, Argentina
Deportes Tolima managers